Carpomys is a genus of rodent in the family Muridae. It contains two extant species, and one extinct species:
 short-footed Luzon tree rat (Carpomys melanurus)
 white-bellied Luzon tree rat (Carpomys phaeurus)
Carpomys dakal

References 

 
Rodents of the Philippines
Rodent genera
Taxa named by Oldfield Thomas
Taxonomy articles created by Polbot
Carpomys